Year 1002 (MII) was a common year starting on Thursday (link will display the full calendar) of the Julian calendar.

Events 
 By place 

 Europe 
 January 23 – Emperor Otto III dies, at the age of 22, of smallpox at Castle of Paterno (near Rome) after a 19-year reign. He leaves no son, nor a surviving brother who can succeed by hereditary right to the throne. Otto is buried in Aachen Cathedral alongside the body of Charlemagne.
 February 15 – At an assembly at Pavia of Lombard nobles and secondi milites (the minor nobles), Arduin of Ivrea (grandson of former King Berengar II) is restored to his domains and crowned as King of Italy in the Basilica of San Michele Maggiore. Arduin is supported by Arnulf II, archbishop of Milan.
 June 7 – Henry II, a cousin of Otto III, is elected and crowned as King of Germany by Archbishop Willigis at Mainz. Henry does not recognise the coronation of Arduin. Otto of Worms withdraws his nomination for the title of Holy Roman Emperor and receives the Duchy of Carinthia (modern Austria) - Henry is the first King to be elected away from the Cathedral of Aachen since the tradition was begun by Otto I in 936.
 July – Battle of Calatañazor: Christian armies led by Alfonso V of León, Sancho III of Pamplona and Sancho García of Castile, defeat the invading Saracens under Al-Mansur, the de facto ruler of Al-Andalus.
 August 8 – Al-Mansur dies after a 24-year reign and is succeeded by his son Abd al-Malik al-Muzaffar as ruler (hajib) of the Umayyad Caliphate of Córdoba (modern Spain).
 October 15 – Henry I, duke of Burgundy, dies and is succeeded by his stepson, Otto-William. He inherits the duchy; this is disputed by King Robert II of France ("the Pious").
 Fall – A revolt organized by Bohemian nobles of the rivalling Vršovci clan, forces Duke Boleslaus III ("the Red") to flee to Germany. He is succeeded by Vladivoj (until 1003).

 British Isles 
 November 13 – St. Brice's Day massacre: King Æthelred the Unready orders all Danes in England killed. Æthelred marries (as his second wife) Emma, daughter of Duke Richard I of Normandy.
 Winter – Æthelred pays tribute (or Danegeld) to Sweyn Forkbeard, buying him off with a massive payment of 24,000 lbs of silver to hold off further Viking raids against England.
 Brian Boru,  king of Leinster and Munster, becomes High King of Ireland. After the submission of Máel Sechnaill mac Domnaill, Brian Boru makes an expedition to the North.

 Arabian Empire 
 Winter – Khalaf ibn Ahmad, Saffarid emir of Sistan (modern Iran), is deposed and surrenders to the Ghaznavid Dynasty after a 39-year reign (approximate date).

 Asia 
 In Japan, court lady Sei Shōnagon completes writing The Pillow Book.

 By topic 

 Religion 
 June – Frederick, archbishop of Ravenna, is sent as an imperial legate to the Synod of Pöhlde, to mediate between the claims of Bishop Bernward of Hildesheim and Willigis, concerning the control of Gandersheim Abbey.

Births 
 May 10 – Al-Khatib al-Baghdadi, Muslim scholar (d. 1071)
 June 21 – Leo IX, pope of the Catholic Church (d. 1054)
 Adolf II of Lotharingia, German nobleman (d. 1041)
 Alice of Normandy, countess of Burgundy (d. 1038)
 Aristakes Lastivertsi, Armenian historian (d. 1080) 
 George I, king of Georgia (approximate date)
 Mei Yaochen, poet of the Song Dynasty (d. 1060)
 Nikephoros III, Byzantine emperor (d. 1081)

Deaths 
 January 8 – Wulfsige III, bishop of Sherborne
 January 23 – Otto III, Holy Roman Emperor (b. 980)
 April 23 – Æscwig, bishop of Dorchester
 April 30 – Eckard I, margrave of Meissen 
 May 6 – Ealdwulf, archbishop of York
 August 8 – Al-Mansur, Umayyad vizier and de facto ruler (b. 938) 
 October 15 – Henry I, duke of Burgundy (b. 946)
 November 13
 Gunhilde, Danish princess and noblewoman
 Pallig, Danish chieftain (jarl) of Devonshire
 Athanasius IV, Syrian patriarch of Antioch
 Domonkos I, archbishop of Esztergom
 Gisela, French princess (approximate date)
 Godfrey I (the Prisoner), Frankish nobleman
 John the Iberian, Georgian monk (approximate date)
 Kisai Marvazi, Persian author and poet (b. 953)
 Rogneda of Polotsk, Grand Princess of Kiev (b. 962)
 Sa'id al-Dawla, Hamdanid emir of Aleppo (Syria)
 Sancho Ramírez, king of Viguera (approximate date)

References